Corinna Genest (born August 16, 1938) is a German film and television actress. She is the daughter of the actress Gudrun Genest and the great niece of Hubert von Meyerinck.

Selected filmography
 Stage Fright (1960)
 Always Trouble with the Teachers (1968)
 Our Doctor is the Best (1969)
 When You're With Me (1970)
  (1970)
 Don't Get Angry (1972)
 Hurra, die Schwedinnen sind da (1978)
 Heiße Kartoffeln (1980)
  (1984)
 Geld oder Leber! (1986)

References

Bibliography 
 Peter Cowie. World Filmography, 1968. Tantivy Press, 1977.

External links 
 

1938 births
Living people
German film actresses
German television actresses
People from Konstanz